Peter Schmidl (born 10 January 1941) is an Austrian clarinetist.

Schmidl was born in Olomouc, Protectorate of Bohemia and Moravia, and studied clarinet with Rudolf Jettel at the University of Music and Performing Arts, Vienna. He was the principal clarinetist of the Vienna Philharmonic Orchestra. He has played with the MDR Orchestra, the Salzburg Mozarteum Orchestra, and the Tokyo New Philharmonia. He has taught at the University of Music and Performing Arts, Vienna since 1967.

Discography
Mozart Symphony No.29 & 25, Clarinet Concerto, with Leonard Bernstein and Vienna Philharmonic,1987Classical Bliss, with various artists. Naxos, 2009.Mozart: Clarinet Concerto / Symphony No. 25, with the Vienna Philharmonic Orchestra. Naxos, 2006.Chill with Beethoven, with various artists. Naxos, 2006.Beethoven for Meditation, with various artists. Naxos, 2005.The Art of the Clarinet'', with Madoka Inui, Teodora Miteva and Pierre Pichler. Naxos, 2003.Peter Schmidl is the son  and grandson of Vienna Philharmonic clarinetists  he comes by the Viennese tone and style naturally

Decorations and awards
 Gold Medal of the Province of Salzburg
 Honorary Ring of the Vienna Philharmonic
 Grand Decoration of Honour for Services to the Republic of Austria (1999)
 Large golden belt of the Vienna Ambulance
 Cross of Honour of Cultural Merit of the Republic of Romania
 Appointment as Special Advisor for Cultural Exchange by the Japanese Ministry of Culture
 Mozart Silver Medal at the International Mozarteum Foundation
 Austrian Cross of Honour for Science and Art, 1st class (2008)

References

1941 births
Austrian classical musicians
Austrian classical clarinetists
Living people
Musicians from Olomouc
Recipients of the Grand Decoration for Services to the Republic of Austria
Recipients of the Austrian Cross of Honour for Science and Art, 1st class
21st-century clarinetists
Moravian-German people
Austrian people of Moravian-German descent